The Quicksilver GT500 is a family of American strut-braced, high-wing, pusher configuration, tricycle gear aircraft built by Quicksilver Aeronautics of Temecula, California. The aircraft is available as a kit for amateur construction or as a completed ready-to-fly aircraft.

Design and development
The GT500 was developed specifically for the Sportplane class of the primary aircraft category (Part 21.24 of the Federal Aviation Regulations) and, on 26 July 1994, became the first aircraft certified in that category. Reviewer Noel Bertrand wrote, "[It] may sound like a very dry achievement, but actually speaks volumes for its design integrity. Not surprisingly its flight behaviour is excellent."

The aircraft's nomenclature is unclear as the manufacturer refers to it variously as the GT500, GT 500 and the GT-500. The FAA certification officially calls it the GT500.

The GT500 is constructed from aluminium tubing, which is bolted together. The aircraft is covered in pre-sewn Dacron envelopes, with the forward fuselage made from fiberglass. The wing features half-span ailerons and half-span flaps. The GT500 has two seats in tandem, with dual controls featuring control columns with yokes. A 1991 upgrade included optional doors that are zippered into place adding  of cruise speed, steel landing gear legs with dual brakes and an electric starter.

Variants
GT400
Single-seat version equipped with a  Rotax 447 two-stroke or  Rotax 503 two-stroke engine. Originally marketed as the GT. Estimated construction time from the kit is 70 hours and 530 had been completed and flown by 2011.
GT500
Two-seats-in-tandem version powered by a  Rotax 582 two-stroke or a  Rotax 912UL four-stroke. The now out-of-production  Rotax 618 two-stroke was a previously available option. Other options include floats, a ballistic parachute system and crop dusting system. Estimated construction time from the kit is 185 hours and 450 had been completed and flown by 2011. The GT500 is certified in the US primary aircraft category, but only when equipped with the Rotax 582 powerplant.

Specifications (GT500)

See also

References

External links

Official GT400 website
Official GT500 website
Photo of GT400

Homebuilt aircraft
Single-engined pusher aircraft
High-wing aircraft
1990s United States ultralight aircraft